Alba Marina is a 1988 telenovela produced by Venevisión. The telenovela was written by Mariela Romero and stars Karina and Xavier Serbiaas of Proyecto M as the main protagonists.

Plot
Nelson Hurtado and Mercedes have a baby girl whom they name Alba Marina. However, Mercedes falls in with another man and leaves alone for Europe leaving her daughter behind.

Father and daughter will live, separately, the most fascinating adventures until, united by destiny, they find the happiness they had never achieved....

Cast
Karina as Alba Marina Marcano
Xavier Serbia
Daniel Alvarado as Nelson Hurtado
Elluz Peraza
René Farrait
Maria Elena Heredia
Diana Juda
Johnny Lozada
Verónica Ortiz

References

External links

1988 telenovelas
Venevisión telenovelas
Venezuelan telenovelas
1988 Venezuelan television series debuts
1988 Venezuelan television series endings
Spanish-language telenovelas
Television shows set in Venezuela